Nozomi, officially stylized as nozomi, is the first photobook by Japanese model Nozomi Sasaki, released in late 2008 by Shueisha.

It consists of photographs of Sasaki taken in Hawaii, Tokyo, and several other places. It also contains her swimsuit photos, without-makeup photos, and several interviews with her.

In its release year of 2008, three commemorative events were held in Tokyo, Osaka, and Sasaki's home city, Akita.

On July 24, 2009, Nozomi Sasaki's first DVD, also titled Nozomi, was released. This DVD documents the making of the photobook.

References

2008 non-fiction books
Photographic collections and books